Cardiac index (CI) is a haemodynamic parameter that relates the cardiac output (CO) from left ventricle in one minute to body surface area (BSA), thus relating heart performance to the size of the individual. The unit of measurement is litres per minute per square metre (L/min/m2).


Calculation
The index is usually calculated using the following formula:

where
 CI  Cardiac index
 BSA  Body surface area
 SV  Stroke volume
 HR  Heart rate
 CO  Cardiac output

Clinical significance
The normal range of cardiac index at rest is 2.6–4.2 L/min/m2.

The cardiac index is frequently measured and used in both intensive care medicine and cardiac intensive care. The CI is a useful marker of how well the heart is functioning as a pump by directly correlating the volume of blood pumped by the heart with an individual's body surface area.

If the CI falls acutely below 2.2 L/min/m2, the patient may be in cardiogenic shock.

References

Cardiovascular physiology
Diagnostic intensive care medicine